The 2002 season was the Buffalo Bills' 43rd as a franchise and 33rd in the National Football League.

The Bills acquired veteran quarterback Drew Bledsoe from the New England Patriots on draft weekend in exchange for Buffalo's first-round pick in the 2003 draft, (the Bills later gained a first-round pick via a sign-and-trade of receiver Peerless Price, coming off a breakout season, to the Atlanta Falcons for their first-round pick in the 2003 draft). Bledsoe brought instant credibility to Buffalo's inept passing game; the Bills' offense scored the sixth most points in the AFC in 2002, after having scored the fifth fewest in the entire league the previous season.

The season saw the Bills change their uniform, which lasted until 2011.

Offseason

Draft

The Bills infamously drafted Mike Williams, an offensive tackle from Texas with the #4 overall pick of the draft, with University of Miami offensive tackle Bryant McKinnie still available. Williams spent only four seasons with the team. Sporting News named Williams as the #4 biggest NFL draft bust from 1989–2008.

Undrafted free agents

Personnel

Roster

Regular season

Due to the Bills' 3–13 record the previous season, the NFL did not schedule any of their games in prime time (Sunday night or Monday night), and all but two of the Bills' games had 1:00 start times. However, due to the attention the Bills' free-agent acquisitions brought to the team, as well as the team being in the thick of the competitive AFC East race, several division games were aired nationally on CBS.

After a one-year absence, the NFL Primetime theme "Powersurge" returned as the Bills' theme song on the ESPN program. It was used for the show's Bills highlights for each game during the season except for the Bengals/Bills game in Week 17.

Schedule

Standings

Game summaries

Week 1: vs. New York Jets

Week 2: at Minnesota Vikings

Week 3: at Denver Broncos

Week 4: vs. Chicago Bears

Week 5: vs. Oakland Raiders

Week 6: at Houston Texans

Week 7: at Miami Dolphins

Week 8: vs. Detroit Lions

Week 9: vs. New England Patriots

Week 11: at Kansas City Chiefs

Week 12: at New York Jets

Week 13: vs. Miami Dolphins

Week 14: at New England Patriots

Week 15: vs. San Diego Chargers

Week 16: at Green Bay Packers

Week 17: vs. Cincinnati Bengals

References

External links
 Buffalo Bills on Pro Football Reference

Buffalo Bills
Buffalo Bills seasons
Buff